Assunção is a Portuguese surname or part of a given name, such in as Maria da Assunção.
It may refer to:

Fábio Assunção, Brazilian actor
Fernando O. Assunção (1931–2006), Uruguayan anthropologist
Paulo Assunção, (born 1980), Brazilian footballer
Marcos Assunção, (born 1976), Brazilian footballer
Infanta Maria da Assunção of Portugal (1805–1834), Portuguese princess
Raphael Assunção (born 1982), Brazilian mixed martial artist

Portuguese-language surnames
Portuguese given names